Catterall (also spelled Catherall) is a surname originating from the place name Catterall in Lancashire. The place name is thought to be of Old Scandinavian origin meaning "a cat's tail", the origin of the Norwegian place name Katralen (formerly Katterall), although it may be from Old English with the second element from halh – a meadow in a river valley. People with the surname include:

 Arthur Catterall (1883–1943), English concert violinist
 Bob Catterall (1900–1961), South African cricket player
Carla P. Catterall (born 1951), Australian ecologist and ornithologist
 Charles Catterall (1914–1966), South African Olympic boxer
 Claire-Louise Catterall, British beauty queen and actress
 Duncan Catterall (born 1978), English cricket player
 Jack Catterall (born 1993), British boxer
 Joanne Catherall (born 1962), English singer for the band The Human League 
 Marlene Catterall (born 1939), Canadian politician from Ontario; MP 1998–2006
 Pippa Catterall (born 1961), British academic historian
 Ralph T. Catterall (1897–1978), American judge
 Simon Catterall (born 1964), American physicist
 Stuart Catterall (born 1975), English cricketer
 William A. Catterall (born 1946), American pharmacologist and neurobiologist

References

English toponymic surnames
Surnames of Scandinavian origin